Neddylation (also NEDDylation) is the process by which the ubiquitin-like protein NEDD8 is conjugated to its target proteins. This process is analogous to ubiquitination, although it relies on its own E1 and E2 enzymes. No NEDD8-specific E3 has yet been identified and it is possible that the Neddylation system relies on E3 ligases with dual specificity.

NEDD8
NEDD8 (neural-precursor-cell-expressed developmentally down-regulated 8) is a protein involved in the regulation of cell growth, viability and development.

Neddylation process
NEDD8 links itself to a protein through an isopeptide linkage between its carboxy-terminal glycine and the lysine of the substrate.
The neddylation of the substrate causes in a structural change, and there are three main biochemical effects that result.  First, neddylation can cause a conformational change in the substrate which may restrict molecular movement and the positioning of different binding partners.  Second, it can cause the target protein to become incompatible with other proteins that it usually binds with.  For example, CAND1 does not bind to neddylated proteins.  In addition, neddylation can recruit NEDD8-interacting proteins.  When NEDD8 binds to the ubiquitin E2 Ubc4, the interaction stimulates cullin-based ubiquitin ligases, although the exact mechanism is unclear.

Disease association
Neddylation is involved in the pathogenesis of Alzheimer's disease where its activation appears to drive neurons into apoptosis by initiating cell cycle reentry.  Also, evidence shows that increased NEDD8 conjugation in human oral carcinoma cells led to abnormal higher degrees of proliferation.  Because NEDD8 conjugation to cullin proteins plays an important role in the regulation of the cell cycle, an upregulation in conjugation causes this proliferation.

References

External links
doi:10.1371/journal.pone.0043391

Proteins
Post-translational modification